The Social Democratic Party (PSD) was a short-lived Mexican political party.

History
The party's first name was Social Democratic and Peasant Alternative Party (Partido Alternativa Socialdemócrata y Campesina) but in May 2007, it changed its name to Social Democratic Alternative Party, and in 2008, it changed once again to simply Social Democratic Party.

The party started as an alliance between two political leaders: Ignacio Irys and Patricia Mercado. However, most of its members come from four extinct parties: the Social Democracy Party, led by Gilberto Rincón Gallardo (which lost its registration as an officially recognized party by barely 20,000 votes in the 2000 election), México Posible, led by Patricia Mercado, Fuerza Ciudadana  and the Partido Campesino y Popular.

According to the documents submitted to the Federal Electoral Institute (IFE), the party had 214,314 members as of July 14, 2005, and it defined itself as a New Left party. Though no longer eligible for elections, the PSD remains as a political view, and  party president is Alberto Begné Guerra and its current vice president is Ignacio Irys Salomon.

Former México Posible leader and feminist activist Patricia Mercado was one of the party founders. She was also the party's presidential candidate in the 2006 elections. In the 2006 legislative elections the party won 4 out of 500 seats in the Chamber of Deputies and no Senators.

The PSD opposed the public influence of the Roman Catholic Church and has challenged the moral and teaching authority of Archbishop of Mexico Cardinal Norberto Rivera. It also pleaded in favor of equal marriage, euthanasia, the decriminalization of abortion and the legalization of some drugs.

The Social Democratic Party came to an end after the results of the 2009 Mexican congressional elections, not reaching the 2.0% required to be eligible for the 2012 elections. Some of its principal members joined to the Citizens' Movement Party

See also
Politics of Mexico
List of political parties in Mexico

References

Political parties established in 2005
Political parties disestablished in 2009
Defunct political parties in Mexico
Social democratic parties in Mexico
Feminist parties in North America
Feminism in Mexico
2005 establishments in Mexico
2009 disestablishments in Mexico